Liberty Hill is an unincorporated community in Wilson County, Tennessee, United States.

References

Unincorporated communities in Wilson County, Tennessee
Unincorporated communities in Tennessee